Sharif Hamzah bin Wahas bin Abi Tayyib ruled Mecca from 451 AH (1058 AD) until 454 AH (1062 AD) during the Fatimid Caliphate. He was the grandson of Abu Tayeb Daoud bin Abdul Rahman. Hamzah ibn Wahas died in 486 AH (1093 AD) in Al-Sulaimani's Mikhlaf.

Ancestry 
In Arabic, the word "ibn" or "bin" is equivalent to "son of." This is occasionally to connect generations of ancestors. Hamzah ibn Wahas's entire name details his lineage to the rift between the Sunni and Shia groups.

His full name is Hamzah ibn Wahas bin Abu Tayeb Daoud bin Abdul Rahman bin Abi Al-Fatik Abdullah bin Dawood bin Suleiman bin Abdullah Al-Reza bin Musa bin Abdullah Al-Kamil bin Al-Hassan Muthanna bin Hassan Al-Sabt bin Ali ibn Abi Talib.

Reign 
Sharif Hamzah ibn Wahas took command of Mecca in 451 AH (1058 AD). He was the last of the Sulaymanid's rule of Banu Hashim. He was overthrown in 454 AH (1062 AD) by Ali bin Muhammad Al-Sulayhi, the sultan of the Sulayhid dynasty in Yemen.

References

Arab kings
11th-century Arabs
1093 deaths
Sunni Islam
Banu Hashim
History of Mecca
 
Alid dynasties
Hashemite people